The 1971 BYU Cougars football team was an American football team that represented Brigham Young University (BYU) as a member of the Western Athletic Conference (WAC) during the 1971 NCAA University Division football season. In their eighth and final season under head coach Tommy Hudspeth, the Cougars compiled an overall record of 5–6 with a mark of 3–4 against conference opponents, finished fourth in the WAC, and outscored opponents by a total of 227 to 199.

Pete Van Valkenburg led the team with 602 rushing yards, 684 yards of total offense, and 48 points scored. Other statistical leaders included Bill August with 448 passing yards, Golden Richards with 238 receiving yards, and Dave Atkinson with nine interceptions.

Schedule

References

BYU
BYU Cougars football seasons
BYU Cougars football